Lesley Wyborn is an Australian geoscientist and geoinformatics specialist, with a focus in high performance computing for geography and online analytics. She is an Adjunct Fellow at the Australian National University.

Early life and education 
Lesley graduated from the University of Sydney in 1972 with a Bachelor of Science in geology. She graduated with 1st class honours. In 1973 she completed a Diploma of Education in science and mathematics at the University of Canberra. In 1978 she went on to complete a Doctor of Philosophy in geology and geochemistry) at the Australian National University.

Research and contributions 
Wyborn has over 42 years in geoscience research and geoinformatics. She began her research career in geochemistry, focusing primarily on the geochemistry of granites, ore deposits and regional alteration systems. She begin using computers in her research in 1994. She determined the essential parts of different Australian mineral systems, and computationally modeled these parts to understand why ore deposits form in certain places.

Wyborn has played a major role in allowing geoscientists to use computers in research. She made contributions to the development of the Geoscience Markup Language (GeoSciML), which allows  access to freely available geoscience data. She also led the development of the Open Geospatial Consortium She was the co-developer of the Australian Virtual Geophysics laboratory, which she worked on from 2012 to 2013.

Lesley's current research involves developing the  NCI National Environmental Research Data Interoperability Platform (NERDIP) and the NeCTAR Virtual Geophysics Laboratory (VGL).

References

Australian geographers
Living people
Year of birth missing (living people)